The Brandon Wheat Kings are a Canadian junior ice hockey team based in Brandon, Manitoba. They are members of the Western Hockey League (WHL) since joining the league in the 1967–68 season. Previously, they played in the Manitoba Junior Hockey League (MJHL), with the exception of two seasons in the mid-1960s when they played in the Saskatchewan Junior Hockey League (SJHL). The team was a successor to the Brandon Wheat City senior team that participated in the 1904 Stanley Cup Challenge, losing to the Ottawa Senators.

The team was known as the Brandon Elks for a short time in the late 1930s. They won eight Turnbull Cup Championships as Manitoba Junior Champions in 1939, 1947, 1949, 1950, 1960, 1962, 1963, and 1964. They appeared in the Memorial Cup six times: 1949 (as an MJHL team), 1979, 1995, 1996, 2010, and 2016, losing each time.  The team plays its home games at the Keystone Centre. They also played at Wheat City Arena until 1969, and the Manex Arena from 1969 to 1972. Between 1973 and 1980, the Wheat Kings owned and operated a farm team in the MJHL, called the Travellers.

The 1949 Brandon Wheat Kings won the Abbott Cup defeating the Calgary Buffaloes. They went on to lose the Memorial Cup to the Montreal Royals. The 1949 Brandon Wheat Kings were inducted into the Manitoba Hockey Hall of Fame in the team category.

The Wheat Kings hold the CHL record for most points (125) in a single season, setting the mark in 1978–79.

The Western Hockey League announced on October 16, 2008, that the Wheat Kings had been chosen to host the 2010 Memorial Cup championship at the Keystone Centre. They reached the final game, losing to the Windsor Spitfires.

The Brandon Wheat Kings mascot is Willie, a coyote/wild dog hybrid.

Season-by-season record 
Note: GP = Games played, W = Wins, L = Losses, T = Ties, OTL = Overtime losses, Pts = Points, GF = Goals for, GA = Goals against

WHL Championship history
1976–77: Loss, 1–4 vs New Westminster
1978–79: Win, 4–2 vs Portland
1994–95: Loss, 2–4 vs Kamloops
1995–96: Win, 4–1 vs Spokane
1997–98: Loss, 0–4 vs Portland
2004–05: Loss, 1–4 vs Kelowna
2014–15: Loss, 0–4 vs Kelowna
2015–16: Win, 4–1 vs Seattle

Current roster 
Updated January 13, 2023.

 

 

 
 
 

 

|}

Team records

NHL alumni

See also 
 List of ice hockey teams in Manitoba

References 

 2005–06 WHL Guide

External links 
 Official website of the Brandon Wheat Kings
 1949 Brandon Wheat Kings at Manitoba Hockey Hall of Fame

1936 establishments in Manitoba
Ice hockey clubs established in 1936
Ice hockey in Brandon, Manitoba
Manitoba Junior Hockey League teams
Western Hockey League teams